Afridun the Martyr was the eighteenth Shah of Shirvan. He was appointed governor of Derbent several times during his father's reign.

Name 
"Afridun" is the arabicized form of the New Persian name Fereydun, an Iranian mythical hero.

Early life 
After having suffered from several raids from the Shaddadid ruler Abu'l-Asvar Shavur I, Afridun was sent by his father Fariburz I to ask for help from the ruler of Sarir, whom Afridun was related to through his mother. However, the ruler of Sarir declined his request, and after three months, Afridun returned to Shirvan. On 30 January 1066, Fariburz appointed Afridun as the governor of Derbent, who was warmly received by its people. On July 1068, Afridun left Derbent and returned to Shirvan.

Reign 
Afridun reigned during an unfortunate time in Shirvanshah history. It is said that he was killed in a battle against "infidels" near Derbent in 1120, possibly while attempting to prevent an invasion from Georgia, thus gaining the nickname "the Martyr". To this day, there is not a single coin that discovered bearing his name. He married his son Manuchehr to David IV's daughter - Tamar.

Legacy
His name is inscribed on Pir Huseyn Khanqah located near river Pirsaat: "This building was ordered to be built by Abu'l Muzaffar Fariburz ibn Gershab, ibn Farrukhzad, ibn Manuchehr's ancestor Jam Afridun"  He is remembered by Khaqani in his ode to Ismataddin: "I saw jewels of Dara in the mines of Afridun the Martyr".

References

Sources

 

 

1120 deaths
1046 births
12th-century Iranian people
11th-century Iranian people
People from Derbent